Peabody River State Fish and Wildlife Area is an Illinois state park on  in Randolph County, Illinois, United States. It is built on reclaimed mines worked by the Peabody Coal Company from the late 1950s to the late 1980s.

See also 
 Finger Lakes State Park: Missouri state park on reclaimed Peabody mines

References

State parks of Illinois
Protected areas of Randolph County, Illinois
Peabody Energy
Coal in Illinois
Mine reclamation